This is a list of first-round draft picks made by D.C. United of Major League Soccer. D.C. United were an original MLS franchise, joining the league in its inaugural 1996 season.

Every year during January, each MLS franchise seeks to add new players to its roster through a collegiate draft known as the "Major League Soccer SuperDraft" which is more commonly known as the MLS Draft. Teams are ranked in inverse order based on the previous season's record, with the worst record picking first, and the second worst picking second and so on. The exception is teams that qualify for the MLS Cup Playoffs, as teams that reach further levels in the playoffs receive a later selection in the draft, with the tiebreaker being regular season record. The MLS Cup champion picks last in the draft, while the MLS Cup runner-up picks second-to-last. Clubs have the option of trading away their picks to other teams for different picks, players, allocation money, or a combination thereof. Thus, it is not uncommon for a team's actual draft pick to differ from their assigned draft pick, or for a team to have extra or no draft picks in any round due to these trades.

United have selected number one overall three times: Freddy Adu, Alecko Eskandarian and Jason Moore. D.C. United's first selection as an MLS team was Raúl Díaz Arce, a Salvadorian international striker who previously played for Firpo of the Primera División de Fútbol de El Salvador. The team's most-recent first-round selection was Michael DeShields, a defender from Wake Forest.

Player selections

References
General References
 
 
Notes

Citations

D.C. United

Association football player non-biographical articles
D.C. United
D.C. United first-round draft picks